The Meadow is a cricket ground in Downpatrick, Northern Ireland. It is the home of Downpatrick Cricket Club. 

In 1983, the ground hosted what is the only first-class match to be played there when Ireland played Scotland, which resulted in an Irish victory by 5 wickets.  In 1990, the ground hosted its first List A match when Ireland played Sussex in the NatWest Trophy.  The ground hosted a further List A match in the 1997 Benson & Hedges Cup between Ireland and Essex, before hosting two List A matches in the 2005 ICC Trophy.  The first of these saw the UAE play the United States, which resulted in a 55 run victory for the UAE.  The second match saw Canada play Papua New Guinea, which resulted in a Canadian victory by 160 runs.

References

External links
The Meadow, Downpatrick at CricketArchive

 

Cricket grounds in Northern Ireland
Downpatrick
Sports venues in County Down